Joshua Ronald Hader (born April 7, 1994) is an American professional baseball pitcher for the San Diego Padres of Major League Baseball (MLB). He has previously played in MLB for the Milwaukee Brewers. Hader is a four-time All-Star and three-time winner of the National League Reliever of the Year Award.

The Baltimore Orioles selected him in the 19th round of the 2012 MLB draft. He was traded twice before joining the Milwaukee Brewers organization in 2015. Hader played for the United States national baseball team in the Pan American Games in 2015, and appeared in the All-Star Futures Game in 2016. Traded to the Milwaukee Brewers organization in 2015, Hader made his MLB debut in 2017. In 2021, he became the fastest pitcher in major league history to reach 400 strikeouts. The Brewers traded Hader to the Padres in 2022.

Early life
Hader attended Old Mill High School in Millersville, Maryland, where he played for the school's baseball team. As a senior, Hader had a 10–0 win–loss record, a 0.30 earned run average (ERA), and 125 strikeouts. He also had a batting average above .400. After graduating from high school, Hader was prepared to enroll at Anne Arundel Community College.

Professional career

Baltimore Orioles (2012–2013)
The Baltimore Orioles selected Hader in the 19th round of the 2012 MLB draft, with the 582nd overall selection. He signed with the Orioles for a $40,000 signing bonus, rather than attend Anne Arundel.

Hader played for the Gulf Coast Orioles in the Rookie-level Gulf Coast League and the Aberdeen Ironbirds of the Class A-Short Season New York–Penn League, allowing only 14 hits and nine walks while striking out 48 in  innings pitched. In 2013, the Orioles assigned Hader to the Delmarva Shorebirds of the Class A South Atlantic League (SAL). He appeared in the SAL All-Star Game, and through July 31, pitched to a 3–6 record with 79 strikeouts and a 2.65 ERA in 17 games started.

Houston Astros (2013–2015)
On July 31, 2013, the day of the MLB trade deadline, the Orioles traded Hader and L. J. Hoes to the Houston Astros in exchange for Bud Norris. He completed his 2013 season with the Quad Cities River Bandits of the Class A Midwest League.

Pitching for the Lancaster JetHawks of the Class A-Advanced California League in 2014, Hader and two relief pitchers combined to throw a no-hitter on May 13. After pitching to a 9–2 record with a league-leading 2.70 ERA and 112 strikeouts in  innings, the Astros promoted him to the Corpus Christi Hooks of the Class AA Texas League in August. He was named the California League Pitcher of the Year. Hader returned to Corpus Christi in the 2015 season. He was selected to play for the United States national baseball team in the 2015 Pan American Games.

Milwaukee Brewers (2015–2022)
On July 30, 2015, the Astros traded Hader, Brett Phillips, Domingo Santana, and Adrian Houser to the Milwaukee Brewers for Carlos Gómez and Mike Fiers. The Brewers assigned Hader to the Biloxi Shuckers of the Class AA Southern League. He finished the season with a 3.03 ERA combined.

The Brewers invited him to spring training in 2016. Hader began the 2016 season with Biloxi, and made his first start for the Colorado Springs Sky Sox of the Class AAA Pacific Coast League on June 12. He was selected to appear in the 2016 All-Star Futures Game. The Brewers added him to their 40-man roster after the season.

Hader began the 2017 season with Colorado Springs. The Brewers promoted him to the major leagues on June 9. He made his major league debut on June 10.

Hader began 2018 in the Milwaukee bullpen. On April 30, Hader became the first pitcher ever to record eight strikeouts in an outing that was less than three innings long. He recorded a -inning save against the Cincinnati Reds, in which he faced nine batters, recording eight strikeouts and one walk. Owning a 1.21 ERA with 83 strikeouts in 44 innings, Hader was named to the 2018 MLB All-Star Game. Hader appeared in the 2018 All-Star Game at the top of the eighth inning. During his appearance, he gave up hits to Rangers' Shin-Soo Choo and Astros' George Springer before Mariners' Jean Segura hit a home run to left field to give the American All-Stars a 5–2 lead. After giving up a single to Boston Red Sox baseman Mitch Moreland, Hader was replaced after 26 pitches, allowing four hits and one out over five batters.

In 2018, Hader was 6–1 with 12 saves and a 2.43 ERA. He had 143 strikeouts in  innings. Among MLB pitchers who threw at least 20 innings, Hader held left-handed batters to the lowest batting average (.088). He won the National League Reliever of the Year Award, becoming the first non-full-time closer to win the award.

Hader began the 2019 season as the Brewers' closer following injuries to fellow relievers Jeremy Jeffress (shoulder strain) and Corey Knebel (Tommy John surgery). On March 30, Hader pitched an immaculate inning to earn the save against the St. Louis Cardinals, striking out Tyler O'Neill, Dexter Fowler, and Yairo Munoz on nine consecutive strikes, seven of which were swinging strikes. Hader received the NL Reliever of the Month Award for both May and June. In the 2019 National League Wild Card Game, Hader blew the save for the Brewers, giving up a three-run single to Juan Soto of the Washington Nationals, which, coupled with an error from right fielder Trent Grisham, led to Washington's go-ahead run scoring on the play and resulted in the Brewers eventually losing the game. Hader finished his 2019 season with a 3–5 record, a 2.62 ERA, and 138 strikeouts over  relief innings. He won his second consecutive NL Reliever of the Year Award.

Hader began the 2020 season with 12 consecutive hitless appearances, the longest such streak in major league history. Hader finished the season with a 3.79 ERA and an NL-leading 13 saves in 15 chances.

On May 8, 2021, Hader reached 400 strikeouts faster than any other pitcher in MLB history, doing so in  innings pitched, breaking the prior record of 236 innings, which had been set by Craig Kimbrel in 2014. For July, Hader was named NL Reliever of the Month, the fourth time he won the award. On September 11, Hader pitched the ninth inning to close out a combined no-hitter against the Cleveland Indians.  He finished the 2021 season with 34 saves in 35 opportunities; he recorded a career-low 1.23 ERA with 102 strikeouts in  innings.

San Diego Padres (2022–present)
After beginning the 2022 season with 25 saves in 27 appearances and a 1.05 ERA, Hader’s pitching declined during the summer, and on August 1, the Brewers traded him to the San Diego Padres for Taylor Rogers, Dinelson Lamet, Esteury Ruiz, and Robert Gasser. He made his Padres debut the following day, earning the win against the Colorado Rockies. However, his struggles continued, including a stretch of earning only two saves in 13 appearances, with an increased ERA of 6.52. 

He regained his all-star form in September, and was instrumental in the Padres' postseason run.

On January 13, 2023, Hader signed a one-year, $14.1 million contract with the Padres, avoiding salary arbitration.

Personal life
Hader is the son of Tom and Patricia Hader. Hader is married to Maria Hader. The couple's first child was born in June 2022.

During the 2018 Major League Baseball All-Star Game, a series of tweets by Hader ranging from mid-2011 to late-2012 were discovered to contain racist, homophobic and sexist content. Friends and family of Hader who were invited to the game were given blank jerseys to wear due to the controversy. Hader issued an apology after the game and deleted his account on Twitter.

See also
 Houston Astros award winners and league leaders

References

External links

1994 births
Living people
Aberdeen IronBirds players
Baseball players at the 2015 Pan American Games
Baseball players from Maryland
Biloxi Shuckers players
Colorado Springs Sky Sox players
Corpus Christi Hooks players
Delmarva Shorebirds players
Gulf Coast Orioles players
Lancaster JetHawks players
Major League Baseball pitchers
Milwaukee Brewers players
National League All-Stars
Pan American Games medalists in baseball
Pan American Games silver medalists for the United States
People from Anne Arundel County, Maryland
Quad Cities River Bandits players
San Diego Padres players
Sportspeople from the Baltimore metropolitan area
United States national baseball team players
Medalists at the 2015 Pan American Games
Twitch (service) streamers